Pervomayskoye is a rural locality (a selo) and the administrative center of Pervomaysky Selsoviet, Pervomaysky District, Altai Krai, Russia. The population was 4,821 as of 2013. There are 42 streets.

Geography 
Pervomayskoye is located 45 km north of Novoaltaysk (the district's administrative centre) by road. Novopovalikha is the nearest rural locality.

References 

Rural localities in Pervomaysky District, Altai Krai